The 2017 FC Tobol season is the 19th successive season that the club playing in the Kazakhstan Premier League, the highest tier of association football in Kazakhstan. Tobol will also play in the Kazakhstan Cup.

Season events
On 27 June, Omari Tetradze resigned as manager, with Robert Yevdokimov taking over as manager on 7 July.

Squad

On Loan

Transfers

Winter

In:

Out:

Summer

In:

Out:

Competitions

Kazakhstan Premier League

Results summary

Results by round

Results

League table

Kazakhstan Cup

Squad statistics

Appearances and goals

|-
|colspan="14"|Players away from Tobol on loan:

|-
|colspan="14"|Players who left Tobol during the season:

|}

Goal scorers

Disciplinary record

References

External links
 Official site

FC Tobol seasons
Tobol